LMO may refer to:

Science and technology
 Lanthanum manganite (LaMnO3), an inorganic compound
 Lithium ion manganese oxide battery (LiMn2O4, etc., or LMO), a cathode material for lithium-ion batteries
 Lithium molybdate (Li2MoO4), an inorganic compound
 Living modified organism or genetically modified organism
 Lunar magma ocean, layer of molten rock theorized to have been present on the surface of the Moon

Other uses
 Lombard language (ISO 639:1 code), of northern Italy and southern Switzerland
 RAF Lossiemouth (IATA airport code), Scotland
 LMO (album), by Rage and Lingua Mortis Orchestra
 Lego Minifigures Online, a defunct massively multiplayer video game